Margot Wells (née Wilkie, born 10 October 1952) is a Scottish elite sprint and fitness coach based in Guildford, Surrey and a former Scottish champion sprinter.

Early career 
Wells started her coaching career by helping her husband Allan Wells win an Olympic Gold and silver medal in the 100m and 200m respectively at the Moscow Olympics in 1980. In the run-up to the Games, she protected him from hate mail generated by the then Soviet Union's involvement in Afghanistan.

Career 
In the early 1990s, she coached rugby players for the club London Scottish. She then took a break from coaching to raise the couple's two children, before returning to coach London Wasps players Danny Cipriani and Thom Evans.

She currently coaches a crop of England's top rugby and hockey players as well as up and coming athletes. Recently she has launched a new company, Wellfast – Margot Wells School of Speed, designed to teach aspiring coaches of all levels the intricacies of making a student faster.

Her stable of sportsmen and women includes:

Danny Cipriani – England and Wasps Fly Half
Andy Gomarsall – England and Harlequins Scrum Half
James Haskell – England and Wasps Back Row
Paul Sackey – England and Wasps Winger
Tom Voyce – England and Wasps Winger
Dom Waldouck – England Saxons and Wasps Centre
Mike Brown – England and Harlequins Full Back

References

External links
Wellfast website

1952 births
Living people
British athletics coaches
Scottish sports coaches
Female sports coaches
Scottish female hurdlers
Scottish female sprinters
British female hurdlers
British female sprinters
Athletes (track and field) at the 1978 Commonwealth Games
Commonwealth Games competitors for Scotland
Sportspeople from Dunfermline